Robert Thomas Beyer (January 27, 1920 – August 20, 2008) was an American physicist, best known for his work in acoustics, and for his translations of Russian and German physics books and journals into English.

Early life and education
Beyer was born in Harrisburg, Pennsylvania on January 27, 1920. He received his A.B. in Mathematics from Hofstra in 1942, and his doctorate in Physics from Cornell University in 1945, with a dissertation focused on magnetic amplifiers.

Career
Beyer was hired as an instructor at Brown University in 1945, where Robert Bruce Lindsay quickly persuaded him to join the physical acoustics laboratory. He spent his entire career at Brown, being appointed assistant professor in 1947, associate professor in 1951, and full professor in 1958, serving as Chairman of the Physics Department from 1968-74.

He co-wrote the book "College Physics" in 1957, followed by the advanced treatises "Physical Ultrasonics" and "Nonlinear Acoustics" in 1969 and 1976, respectively.
In 2000, his book "Sounds of Our Times", a history of the science of acoustics since 1800, was published by Springer Science+Business Media.

Translations
Beyer translated John von Neumann's Mathematical Foundations of Quantum Mechanics from German into English, in 1955, for Princeton University Press.

Personal life
Beyer was afflicted with severe rheumatic fever as a teenager, which damaged his heart, and later by multiple sclerosis.

He married the former Ellen Fletcher on Valentine's Day in 1944, and they remained devoted to each other until Ellen's death in 2005. They had four children:  Catherine Beyer Hurst, Margaret Beyer, Rick Beyer, and Mary Beyer Trotter.

He died in August 2008.

References

External links 

 Oral history interview transcript for Robert T. Beyer on 11 November 1991, American Institute of Physics, Niels Bohr Library and Archives

20th-century American physicists
1920 births
2008 deaths
Brown University faculty
Acousticians
People from Harrisburg, Pennsylvania
Hofstra University alumni
Cornell University alumni
Fellows of the Acoustical Society of America
ASA Gold Medal recipients
Fellows of the American Physical Society